The discography of The Hoosiers, a British pop rock band, contains four studio albums, three extended plays, seven singles and seven music videos.

The Hoosiers' debut album, The Trick to Life, was released by RCA Records in the United Kingdom in October 2007. The album peaked at number one on the UK Album Chart and has been certified two times platinum by the British Phonographic Industry. The Trick of Life produced the singles "Worried About Ray", "Goodbye Mr A", "Worst Case Scenario" and "Cops and Robbers". "Worried About Ray" and "Goodbye Mr A" both managing to peak within the top five on the UK Singles Chart at numbers five and four respectively.

Albums

Studio albums

Extended plays

Singles

with Woody & Kleiny
 "Route 66" (2021) reached number one in the UK Official Singles Downloads Chart Top 100

Music videos

References

External links

Discographies of British artists
Rock music group discographies